WLT may refer to:

Land trusts 
 World Land Trust
 Wildlife Land Trust Australia
 Humane Society Wildlife Land Trust

Other uses
 Astro Wah Lai Toi, a Malaysian video pay channel
 Wallington railway station, National Rail code WLT
 Welsh Terrier, Canadian Kennel Club breed code WLT
 West London Tram
 WLT: A Radio Romance, a 1991 novel by Garrison Keillor
 World Literature Today, an American literary magazine
 Writers' League of Texas

See also
 WTL (disambiguation)